Ballads and Songs was a Canadian music variety television series which aired on CBC Television in 1969.

Premise
This series was produced in English and French by CBC's French network, Radio-Canada, for the English network. Episodes were recorded in various locations throughout all Canadian provinces. The series included a range of musical artists of various genres from individuals to choirs. Songs of both Canadian languages were featured.

Scheduling
The half-hour series aired on Sundays at 5:30 p.m. (Eastern) from 6 July to 28 September 1969.

References

External links
 

CBC Television original programming
1969 Canadian television series debuts
1969 Canadian television series endings
Ici Radio-Canada Télé original programming